The Little Maple River is a  tributary of the Maple River in the central part of the Lower Peninsula of the U.S. state of Michigan. It rises in Victor Township, Clinton County at the outlet of Cedar Lake. It flows through Sleepy Hollow State Park which surrounds Lake Ovid. Lake Ovid was created by damming the Little Maple River. The Little Maple River joins the Maple River in Ovid Township, Clinton County.

References

External links
 Friends of the Maple River

Rivers of Clinton County, Michigan
Rivers of Michigan
Tributaries of Lake Michigan